Aimée Fournier de Horrack (30 August 1876 – 25 February 1952) was a French entomologist.

She is also known as Mlle de Horrack and Mme Gaston Fournier. Aimée Fournier was a butterfly collector. She lived in Paris at 90, Boulevard Malesherbes. Her collection is in Muséum National d'Histoire Naturelle.
She is honoured in the name Charaxes fournierae.

Works
1921 with Percy Ireland Lathy 'Thèses entomologiques (Lepidoptéres) : notes et remarques sur les Agrias : aquarelles de Mlles de La Roche et Trottet, MM. d'Apreval, Houlbert et Rouy d'apre's les originaux de Mlle du Puigaudeau (Odix). fascicule 1 Paris : [G. de Malherbe],

References
 Groll, E. K. (ed.): Biografien der Entomologen der Welt: Datenbank''. Version 4.15 : Senckenberg Deutsches Entomologisches Institut, 2010 

1876 births
1952 deaths
Women entomologists
French lepidopterists
19th-century French zoologists
20th-century French zoologists
Scientists from Paris